Carl Hagman (12 October 1890 – 7 February 1949) was a stage and film Swedish actor and singer. He appeared in more than more than 40 films between 1911 and 1949. He was married to the actress Emy Hagman between 1927 and 1941.

Selected filmography

 Boman at the Exhibition (1923)
 For Her Sake (1930)
 65, 66 and I (1936)
 Hotel Paradise (1937)
 Just a Bugler (1938)
 We at Solglantan (1939)
 Swing it, magistern! (1940)
 The Train Leaves at Nine (1941)
 Poor Ferdinand (1941)
 Magistrarna på sommarlov (1941)
 Captured by a Voice (1943)
 She Thought It Was Him (1943)
 In Darkest Smaland (1943)
 Eaglets (1944)
 His Majesty Must Wait (1945)
 The Österman Brothers' Virago (1945)
 Incorrigible (1946)
 The Bride Came Through the Ceiling (1947)
 Neglected by His Wife (1947)
 No Way Back (1947)
 Robinson in Roslagen (1948)
 A Swedish Tiger (1948)

References

External links

1890 births
1949 deaths
Swedish male film actors
Swedish male silent film actors
20th-century Swedish male actors
20th-century Swedish male singers
Swedish male musical theatre actors
Male actors from Stockholm
Burials at Norra begravningsplatsen